Bertha Moss (August 7, 1919 – February 4, 2008), born Juana Bertha Moscovish Holm, was an Argentine-Mexican actress of stage, television and film, famous for appearing in many Mexican telenovelas.

Life
She was born in Buenos Aires, Argentina. She died February 4, 2008, in Buenos Aires.

She started her career in the cinema of her native Argentina and moved to Mexico in 1959 when she obtained a role in the telenovela El precio del cielo. Her first film in Mexico came three years later with El ángel exterminador by Luis Buñuel.

Telenovelas

 Preciosa (1998) as Eduarda Santander
 María Isabel (1997) as Eugenia
 Alondra (1995)
 Los Parientes Pobres (1993) as Tía Brígida
 Amor de nadie (1990) as Victoria
 Muchachita (1986)
 Pobre juventud (1986)
 El hombre de la mandolina (1985)
 Juana Iris (1985) as Raquel
 Amor ajeno (1983) as Sara
 Extraños caminos del amor (1981)
 La divina Sarah (1980) as Simona
 Secreto de confesión (1980)
 Bella y bestia (1979)
 Cumbres borrascosas (1979)
 Muñeca rota (1978)
 Corazón salvaje (1977) as Sofía
 Mañana será otro día (1976) as Hortensia
 Paloma (1975) as Catalina
 La recogida (1971) as Matilde
 Encrucijada (1970)
 Los inconformes (1968)
 Frontera (1967)
 Secreto de confesión (1965)
 Historia de un cobarde (1964)
 Agonia de amor (1963)
 Eugenia (1963)
 Codicia (1962)
 Niebla (1961)
 Mi esposa se divorcia (1959)
 El precio del cielo (1959)

Films

Cinema of Argentina
 La Bestia humana (1957)
 El hombre virgen (1956)
 La tierra del fuego se apaga (1955)
 Mercado de abasto (1955)
 Mujeres casadas (1954)
 La Mejor del colegio (1953)
 Deshonra (1952)
 Mujeres en sombra (1951)
 La vida color de rosa (1951)
 Yo no elegí mi vida (1949)
 Story of a Bad Woman (1948) 
 La serpiente de cascabel (1948) as jailer Graciela
 El hombre que amé (1947)
 Un ángel sin pantalones (1947)
 Musical Romance (1947)
 Albergue de mujeres (1946)
 Cristina (1946)
 Los Dos rivales (1944)
 El fin de la noche (1944)
 Captain Poison (1943)
 Amor último modelo (1942)
 Ceniza al viento (1942)
 Incertidumbre (1942)

Cinema of Mexico
 La Paloma de Marsella (1999)
 Barrio de campeones (1981)
 El hombre del puente (1976) as blond peasant
 La recogida (1974)
 Conserje en condominio (1974) as Candy
 Hay ángeles sin alas (1972)
 Padre nuestro que estas en la tierra (1972) as Carlota
 Apolinar (1972)
 Los corrompidos (1971) as Amanda
 La Hermanita Dinamita (1970) as Angela Molina
 Persiguelas y alcanzalas (1969)
 Como perros y gatos (1969)
 No se mande, profe (1969)
 Romeo contra Julieta (1968)
 La endemoniada (1968)
 El bastardo (1968)
 Tres mil kilómetros de amor (1967)
 Arrullo de Dios (1967)
 Domingo salvaje (1967)
 La Venus maldita (1967)
 Rancho solo (1967)
 La alegría de vivir (1965)
 ¡Ay, Jalisco no te rajes! (1965)
 El Robo al tren correo (1964)
 Historia de un canalla (1964)
 Los derechos de los hijos (1963) as Bertha
 La invasión de los vampiros (1963) as Frau Hildegarde
 Mi vida es una canción (1963)
 The Bloody Vampire (1962) as Frau Hildegarde
 The Exterminating Angel (1962) as Leonora

See also
 Foreign-born artists in Mexico
 List of telenovela actors

External links
 

1919 births
2008 deaths
Actresses from Buenos Aires
Argentine film actresses
Jewish Argentine actresses
Mexican film actresses
Mexican stage actresses
Mexican telenovela actresses
Argentine emigrants to Mexico